The Australian Church (1884–1957) was founded by Dr. Charles Strong in Melbourne.

Charles Strong was a Presbyterian minister who, previously, had been charged with heresy because of his liberal theology.

The Australian Church had a firm commitment to social justice and was active in the anti-conscription campaigns during World War I.
 
Australia's second Prime Minister Alfred Deakin was a member of this church.

References

Presbyterianism in Australia
Religious organizations established in 1884
1957 disestablishments in Australia
Christian denominations established in the 19th century
1884 establishments in Australia